Johannes Martinus (Han) Groenewegen (October 27, 1888 (The Hague) – April 4, 1980 (Jakarta)) was a Dutch architect who was active in the Netherlands and the Dutch East Indies, and subsequently, Indonesia from the 1920s to the 1960s.

Biography
 
Han Groenewegen worked in the Hague as a freelance architect from 1920 to 1927. Before establishing his own firm, he used to work for the contractor R. Rutgers in the Hague. One of his few works in the Netherlands is the Church of the Holy Heart of Jesus in Schiedam. During the Great Depression, Groenewegen left the Netherlands to established his own new firm in the Dutch East Indies. Many other architects were left for the Indies during the period, e.g. Albert Aalbers. Groenewegen arrived in Medan (on the island of Sumatra) in 1927 to work on the plan for a hospital, the St. Elisabeth's Hospital (1929-1930). He was active in Medan from 1927 to 1942 to work for the Oostkust. Like Schoemaker for the city of Bandung, Gronewegen can be considered as representative of modernist Nieuwe Bouwen in Medan. Among Groenewegen's extensive portfolio in Medan are the expansion of Medan Cathedral (1928), Arnhem Insurance (now Museum Perjuangan TNI, 1930), the Roman Catholic Chinese church in Polonia (1934), Princess Beatrix School (now Immanuel Christian School, 1938), Medan swimming pool (1939), and Oranjeschool (1941). Unlike many of his colleagues however, Groenewegen remained in Indonesia following the independence of the country.

After the war, Groenewegen moved to Jakarta from 1947. Shortly after the war, he worked on the central reconstruction plans. One of the first buildings designed by Groenewegen in Jakarta is the Menteng cinema in Javaweg (1949-1950, now demolished). Other designs in Jakarta are the houses for the Java Bank (1952), Sumber Waras hospital in Grogol (1957), a crematorium (1958) and the Dutch embassy and chancery (1960 and 1966). From 1957, Groenewegen worked in association with Indonesian architect F. Silaban, e.g. for Bank Indonesia in Jakarta. He also worked as an architecture lecturer. Groenewegen died in April 1980 in the hospital Sumber Waras he designed.

Groenewegen also had several works outside Medan and Jakarta, e.g. the Sumber Waras hospital in Padang (1956-1957), Savoy cinema in Bukittinggi (1957), and Museum Seni Modern in Bali (1959).

Design philosophy

Groenewegen was heavily influenced by the principle of Amsterdam School. While staying and working in Indonesia, Groenewegen began to incorporate Indies architectural element in his works.

See also
 List of colonial buildings in Medan for his works in Medan.

References

Cited works

External links

1888 births
1980 deaths
Architects from The Hague
Colonial architecture in Indonesia
20th-century Dutch architects
20th-century Indonesian architects
Medan
World War II civilian prisoners held by Japan